Events from the year 1701 in England.

Incumbents
 Monarch – William III
 Parliament – 5th of King William III (starting 6 February, until 11 November), 6th of King William III (starting 30 December)

Events
 January – Robert Walpole enters Parliament and soon makes his name as a spokesman for Whig policy.
 23 May – After being convicted of murder and piracy, Captain William Kidd is hanged in London.
 24 June – The Act of Settlement 1701, by the Parliament of England, becomes law. The crown of Great Britain passes to Sophia, Electress of Hanover and her Protestant descendants on the death of Princess Anne, the heiress presumptive to the throne after her brother in law, King William III.
 7 September – The Treaty of Grand Alliance signed between England, Austria and the Dutch Republic.
 16 September (N.S.) – Following the death of the deposed King James II of England in exile in France, his son Prince James Francis Edward Stuart becomes the new claimant to the thrones of England as King James III and Scotland as King James VIII. Louis XIV of France, the Papal States and Philip V of Spain recognise him as the rightful heir.
 December – Nicholas Rowe's play Tamerlane premieres at the Lincoln's Inn Fields Theatre in London. Its pro-Whig views make it popular amongst supporters of King William and the Glorious Revolution

Undated
 Jethro Tull invents a drill for planting seeds in rows.
 Foundation of the Society for the Propagation of the Gospel in Foreign Parts in London.
 Opening of the Bevis Marks Synagogue in London, the oldest synagogue in the United Kingdom in continuous use.

Births
 14 May – William Emerson, mathematician (died 1782)
 19 December – Francis Ayscough, clerk of the Closet (died 1763)
 Harriet Pelham-Holles, Duchess of Newcastle-upon-Tyne, née Lady Harriet Godolphin, spouse of the Prime Minister (died 1776)

Deaths
 4 April – Joseph Haines, entertainer and author (year of birth unknown)
 20 August – Charles Sedley, playwright (born 1639)
 22 August – John Granville, 1st Earl of Bath, royalist statesman (born 1628)
 16 September – James II of England, deposed king (born 1633)
 3 October – Joseph Williamson, politician (born 1633)
 5 November – Charles Gerard, 2nd Earl of Macclesfield, French-born English politician (born c. 1659)

References

 
Years of the 18th century in England